This article presents life expectancy at birth for the 435 United States congressional districts plus Washington, D.C. (non-voting district). Life expectancy varies from an average 83.9 years in California's 19th district to 72.9 years in Kentucky's 5th district (rural southeastern Kentucky), a gap of 11 years.

Life expectancy is calculated using 2011 mortality data from the Centers for Disease Control and Prevention and population data from the U.S. Census Bureau. These estimates were taken from the Measure of America's report Geographies of Opportunity. Life expectancies can have pronounced differences even in districts that are only hours apart and can highlight inequalities even within the same state. Residents of Pennsylvania's congressional district 16 have a life expectancy of 80.5 years, about 1.5 years longer than the national average. In Pennsylvania's District 2, the average resident has a life expectancy of just 75.6 years.

Table

See also
 List of U.S. states and territories by life expectancy
 List of U.S. states by changes in life expectancy, 1985–2010
 List of U.S. counties with shortest life expectancy
 List of U.S. counties with longest life expectancy

References

External links 
 
 US Health Map – Life expectancy, mortality, and risk factor maps by county, over time

Notes 
 Table data from Measure of America calculations using mortality data from the Centers for Disease Control and Prevention, National Center for Health Statistics, as compiled from data provided by the 57 vital statistics jurisdictions through the Vital Statistics Cooperative Program.

United States congressional districts
United States